The Bowditch School is an historic school building at 80—82 Green Street in the Jamaica Plain neighborhood of Boston, Massachusetts.  The three story brick and granite Classical Revival building was designed by Harrison Henry Atwood, a prominent local architect, and was built in 1892.  Its main facade has a projecting three-part pavilion, with square entry openings at the base, and round-arch windows at the top level, with a modillioned cornice.  It is named for Nathaniel Bowditch, a noted early 19th-century astronomer and mathematician.

By 1981 Boston Public Schools stopped using the facility, and the city government deemed it excess to the city's needs in July of that year.

The building was listed on the National Register of Historic Places in 1990.

Gallery

See also
National Register of Historic Places listings in southern Boston, Massachusetts

References

School buildings completed in 1892
School buildings on the National Register of Historic Places in Massachusetts
Schools in Boston
Jamaica Plain, Boston
National Register of Historic Places in Boston